Day of the Dog is the second studio album by Chicago rock musician Ezra Furman. It was released in October 2013 by Bar/None Records. It comes after her début solo album The Year of No Returning which follow three albums with her previous backing band The Harpoons, it was recorded with her new backing band The Boyfriends, who formed in 2012 to tour The Year of No Returning.

Track listing
All songs written and composed by Ezra Furman, except "The Mall", written and composed by Paul Baribeau

References

2013 albums
Bar/None Records albums
Blues rock albums by American artists
Rock-and-roll albums